Khakas Aluminium Smelter (Khakasskiy Alyuminiyevy Zavod) or KhAZ is an aluminium smelter located near Sayanogorsk, Russia. Owned by the Russian aluminium industry champion RUSAL, it is one of the largest companies in the Russia's Republic of Khakassia. It was the first major aluminium plant opened in post-Soviet Russia.

The construction began in 2004. The first metal was produced in December 2006, and the project capacity of 300,000 tons of aluminium per year was achieved in October 2007. Total investment in the project reached $750 million.

References

External links 
Official site of the Khakas Aluminium Smelter 

Buildings and structures in Khakassia
Rusal
Companies based in Khakassia